LWF may refer to

 Lutheran World Federation, an organization of Lutheran denominations
 Lightweight Fighter program, a project of the United States Air Force
 Love Worth Finding, a radio and television ministry
 Lightweight fighter, a class of planes

Initialisms